Jason Dormon (born 2 May 1969) is a British bassist and venue owner. He is most noted for his work in Joeyfat and also for his running of the Tunbridge Wells Forum.

Early life
Dormon was born in Tunbridge Wells and educated at Bethany School.

Music career
In 1991, he formed the post-hardcore collective Joeyfat and spent the early 1990s releasing music with a number of independent record labels including Fierce Panda, as well as touring with the likes of Green Day, China Drum, Jawbox, and Scarfo.

In 1996, Joeyfat broke up and Dormon went on to form Unhome, alongside Alex Tucker, who were a post-rock hardcore 5-piece. The band released one album, A Short History of Houses, and a split single with Papa M.

Unhome split in late 1999 and at this point he formed the band Rebus who played for a few years before splitting. Around 2000 Jason got back together with Joeyfat to play a series of shows to promote The Unwilling Astronaut, a sixteen track collection of studio, live and session work spanning the years 1991 to 1996. They have since remained together, and have been playing gigs at a steady rate and releasing occasional tracks.

Their debut thirteen-track album, You Can Change People's Lives With Your Mouth / The House of the Fat was released on CD, and limited edition vinyl, in 2003 on Unlabel. Also in July 2003, Joeyfat recorded a Peel Session for BBC Radio 1. This was followed by a 2CD collection of tracks from singles and compilations, Ye Bloody Flux in 2011, and a second studio album, the double vinyl Suit of Lights in 2013. Joeyfat recorded a session for Marc Riley on BBC Radio 6music in June 2017.

The Forum
Dormon's career in music promoting began on 17 May 1988 when, along with a group of friends (including Ian Carvell, Stephen Cookson, David Jarvis and Haydn Wood), they put on The Brilliant Corners at the Rumble Club in Grosvenor Park Rec hall in Tunbridge Wells. The Rumble Club, as a music venue went on to use various premises in the area, including The Watson Hall, Langton, The Hand & Sceptre in Southborough, and the lower floor of the former Winchester pub on Nevill Street, Tunbridge Wells (now the Thorins wine bar). Jason has said that he and his friends put on shows because they were fed up with the cost and travel of going to London to watch bands.

In December 1992 Dormon and a group of friends opened Tunbridge Wells Forum as a new music venue in a building on Tunbridge Wells Common which was previously used as a public toilet and a brass rubbing centre. It has since hosted a number of acts who have gone on to achieve significant commercial success.

In 2010, Dormon was featured in The Independent'''s "Happy List", profiling people who make Britain a better place to live.

In 2011, Jeremy Pritchard, bassist with the band Everything Everything, named Dormon as the person who has creatively influenced him the most.

In 2012, The Forum was named as the NME'' Best Small Venue.

The Music Venue Trust came into being in 2014 to protect and nurture small independent venues. Dormon was appointed a trustee.

References

External links
Tunbridge Wells Forum website
Joeyfat myspace page

Living people
Male bass guitarists
People from Royal Tunbridge Wells
Music promoters
British rock bass guitarists
Musicians from Royal Tunbridge Wells
1971 births
People educated at Bethany School, Goudhurst
Musicians from Kent
21st-century English bass guitarists
21st-century British male musicians